Stuffed bitter melon soup or stuffed bitter gourd soup (canh khổ qua nhồi thịt) is a soup in Vietnamese cuisine  which is popular in Asia. The New York Times also mentioned the dish as part of the Vietnamese Lunar New Year culture.

Its main ingredient is bitter melon with some different stuffed ingredients depending on who made it. The most used stuffed ingredient is pork.

General information 
Bitter melon has many names depending on the country that call them, for example, Gourd melon, ‘Mara’ in Thai, and ‘Leung Gwa’, which means ‘the cooling melon’ in Cantonese.

Bitter melon is in season in the summer while dried for off-season.

Ingredients 
The main ingredient is bitter melon. Most of the stuffed ingredient are pork or fish, along with some condiments, such as glass noodles or bean thread noodles,  jelly ear, dried shrimp, shallot or  green onion, sprigs of cilantro, egg-white,  soy sauce or fish sauce, pepper, or salt, sugar.

Vegan version of classic Vietnamese  bitter melon soup use sweet pork imitation seitan noodles to stuff bitter melon with scallion for flavor.

References 

Cantonese cuisine
Vietnamese cuisine